Antoine Bertier (1761–1854) was a French landowner and politician.

Early life
Antoine Bertier was born on 24 September 1761 in Nancy, France. He was educated in Hamburg, Germany.

Career
Bertier made a fortune in Saint-Domingue. He returned to France in 1789, where he supported the French Revolution. Two years later, in 1791, he lost much of his fortune in the Haitian Revolution.

Bertier became a large landowner in Roville-devant-Bayon, Meurthe. He was the co-founder of the Société centrale d’agriculture in Nancy alongside Mathieu de Dombasle.

Bertier served as a member of the Chamber of Representatives during the Hundred Days from 10 May 1815 to 13 July 1815, representing Meurthe. He became a Knight of the Legion of Honour on 1 May 1838.

Death
Bertier died on 4 December 1854 in Roville-devant-Bayon, France.

References

1761 births
1854 deaths
Politicians from Nancy, France
People of Saint-Domingue
Chevaliers of the Légion d'honneur